Lophiotoma picturata is a species of sea snail, a marine gastropod mollusk in the family Turridae.

Description
The length of the shell attains 43 mm, its diameter 14.5 mm.

The shell is bluntly carinated by a pair of approximated revolving ribs, with numerous smaller but unequal ribs. Its color is white, with chestnut spots, sometimes coalescing into longitudinal stripes, and a row of larger spots at the suture. The spire contains 11 slightly convex whorls. These are separated by a fine, often barely visible suture. The aperture is oblong, whitish inside. The elongate siphonal canal is much shorter than in the other species of this genus. The columella is straight. The outer lip is sharp and slightly fissured, with a rather short incision on top, ending in the doubled keel.

Distribution
This marine species occurs in the Indian Ocean and off Papua New Guinea.

References

External links

 Puillandre N., Fedosov A.E., Zaharias P., Aznar-Cormano L. & Kantor Y.I. (2017). A quest for the lost types of Lophiotoma (Gastropoda: Conoidea: Turridae): integrative taxonomy in a nomenclatural mess. Zoological Journal of the Linnean Society. 181: 243-271

picturata
Gastropods described in 1876